Aralia rex is a species of flowering plant in the family Araliaceae. It has also been treated as Megalopanax rex, the only species in the genus Megalopanax. It is endemic to Cuba.

References

Araliaceae
Critically endangered plants
Endemic flora of Cuba
Plants described in 1924